Arnold Scholz (24 December 1904 in Berlin – 1 February 1942 in Flensburg) was a German mathematician who proved Scholz's reciprocity law and introduced the Scholz conjecture.

Scholz participated in the Second Conference on the Epistemology of the Exact Sciences contributing the paper "On the Use of the Term Holism in Axiomatics" to the discussion on the foundation of mathematics.

Publications

References
 
 

1942 deaths
1904 births
20th-century German mathematicians